Calve can refer to:

Calving (disambiguation)
Calve Island, Scotland

Surname
Emma Calvé
Jean Calvé

See also
Calf (disambiguation)